Ñadis Airport  is an airstrip serving settlements in the valleys of the Barrancoso and Baker Rivers in the Aysén Region of Chile.

The airstrip is alongside the confluence of the two rivers. There is nearby mountainous terrain in all quadrants.

See also

Transport in Chile
List of airports in Chile

References

External links
OpenStreetMap - Ñadis
OurAirports - Ñadis
FallingRain - Ñadis Airport

Airports in Chile
Airports in Aysén Region